The 2019 BAUHAUS-galan was the 52nd edition of the annual outdoor track and field meeting in Stockholm, Sweden. Held on 30 May 2019 at Stockholm Olympic Stadium, it was the third leg of the 2019 IAAF Diamond League – the highest level international track and field circuit. 38 events were contested with 13 of them being point-scoring Diamond League disciplines.

Diamond League results
Athletes competing in the Diamond League disciplines earned extra compensation and points which went towards qualifying for one of two Diamond League finals (either Zürich or Brussels depending on the discipline). First place earned eight points, with each step down in place earning one less point than the previous, until no points are awarded in ninth place or lower.

Men

Female

See also
2019 Weltklasse Zürich (first half of the Diamond League final)
2019 Memorial Van Damme (second half of the Diamond League final)

References

Results
"Results Archive Diamond League Selected Season: 2019". Diamond League (2019-05-30). Retrieved 2021-05-01.

External links
Official Diamond League BAUHAUS-galan website

BAUHAUS-galan
BAUHAUS-galan
BAUHAUS-galan